Second-seeded Alex Olmedo defeated Neale Fraser 6–1, 6–2, 3–6, 6–3 in the final to win the men's singles tennis title at the 1959 Australian Championships.

Seeds
The seeded players are listed below. Alex Olmedo is the champion; others show the round in which they were eliminated.

  Neale Fraser (finalist)
  Alex Olmedo (champion)
  Roy Emerson (quarterfinals)
  Andrés Gimeno (quarterfinals)
  Rod Laver (third round)
  Barry MacKay (semifinals)
  Bob Mark (semifinals)
  Butch Buchholz (second round)
  Bob Howe (second round)
  Ulf Schmidt (quarterfinals)
  Don Candy (quarterfinals)
  Jan-Erik Lundqvist (third round)
  Warren Woodcock (third round)
  Trevor Fancutt (second round)
  Martin Mulligan (third round)
  Christopher Crawford (third round)

Draw

Key
 Q = Qualifier
 WC = Wild card
 LL = Lucky loser
 r = Retired

Finals

Earlier rounds

Section 1

Section 2

Section 3

Section 4

External links
 

1959 in tennis
1959
1959 in Australian tennis